The Solemnity of the Immaculate Conception, also called Immaculate Conception Day, celebrates the sinless lifespan and Immaculate Conception of the Blessed Virgin Mary on 8 December, nine months before the feast of the Nativity of Mary, celebrated on 8 September. It is one of the most important Marian feasts in the liturgical calendar of the Roman Catholic Church celebrated worldwide.

By Pontifical decree, it is the patronal feast day of Argentina, Brazil, Chile, Italy, Korea, Nicaragua, Paraguay, the Philippines, Spain, the United States, and Uruguay. By royal decree, it is designated as the day honoring the patroness of Portugal. It is celebrated by the Roman Catholic Church and some select Protestant Christian denominations.

Since 1953, the Pope visits the Column of the Immaculate Conception in the Piazza di Spagna to offer expiatory prayers commemorating the solemn event.

The feast was first solemnized as a Holy day of obligation on 6 December 1708 under the Papal Bull Commissi Nobis Divinitus by Pope Clement XI and is often celebrated with Catholic Mass, parades, fireworks, processions,  food, and cultural festivities in honor of the Blessed Virgin Mary and is generally considered a Family Day, especially in many pious Catholic countries.

History

The Eastern Christian Church first celebrated a "Feast of the Conception of the Most Holy and All Pure Mother of God" on 9 December, perhaps as early as the 5th century in Syria. The original title of the feast focused more specifically on Saint Anne, being termed Sylepsis tes hagias kai theoprometoros Annas ("conception of Saint Anne, the ancestress of God"). By the 7th century, the feast was already widely known in the East. However, when the Eastern Church called Mary Achrantos ("spotless", "immaculate") — this was not defined doctrine.

The majority of Orthodox Christians do not accept the Scholastic definition of Mary's preservation from original sin before her birth as subsequently defined in the Western Church after the Great Schism of 1054. After the feast was translated to the Western Church in the 8th century, it began to be celebrated on 8 December. It spread from the Byzantine area of Southern Italy to Normandy during the period of Norman dominance over southern Italy. From there it spread to England, France, Germany, and eventually Rome.

In 1568, Pope Pius V revised the Roman Breviary, and though the Franciscans were allowed to retain the Office and Mass written by Bernardine dei Busti, this office was suppressed for the rest of the Church, and the office of the Nativity of the Blessed Virgin was substituted instead, the word "Conception" being substituted for "Nativity".

According to the Papal Bull Commissi Nobis Divinitus, dated 6 December 1708, Pope Clement XI mandated the feast as a Holy Day of oligation which is to be celebrated in future years by the faithful. Furthermore, the pontiff requested that the papal bull be notarized in the Holy See to be further copied and reproduced for dissemination.

Prior to Pope Pius IX's definition of the Immaculate Conception as a Roman Catholic dogma in 1854, most missals referred to it as the Feast of the Conception of the Blessed Virgin Mary. The festal texts of this period focused more on the action of her conception than on the theological question of her preservation from original sin. A missal published in England in 1806 indicates the same Collect for the feast of the Nativity of the Blessed Virgin Mary was used for this feast as well.

The first move towards describing Mary's conception as "immaculate" came in the 11th century. In the 15th century, Pope Sixtus IV, while promoting the festival, explicitly tolerated both the views of those who promoted it as the Immaculate Conception and those who challenged such a description, a position later endorsed by the Council of Trent.

The proper for the feast of the Conception of the Blessed Virgin Mary in the Medieval Sarum Missal merely addresses the fact of her conception.
The collect for the feast reads:
O God, mercifully hear the supplication of thy servants who are assembled together on the Conception of the Virgin Mother of God, may at her intercession be delivered by Thee from dangers which beset us.

Roman Catholic Church

Pope Pius IX in 8 December 1854 issued the Apostolic constitution Ineffabilis Deus:

According to the Universal Norms on the Liturgical Year and the Calendar, the solemnity of the Immaculate Conception cannot replace an Advent Sunday; if 8 December falls on a Sunday, the solemnity is transferred to the following Monday. (In some countries, including the United States, the obligation to attend Mass does not transfer.) The 1960 Code of Rubrics, still observed by some in accordance with Summorum Pontificum, gives the feast of the Immaculate Conception preference even over an Advent Sunday.

Anglican Communion
In the Church of England, the "Conception of the Blessed Virgin Mary" may be observed as a Lesser Festival on 8 December without the religious designation as "sinless", "most pure" or "immaculate". 

The situation in other constituent churches of the Anglican Communion is similar, i.e., as a lesser commemoration.

Oriental Orthodoxy
The Ethiopian Orthodox Tewahedo Church celebrates the Feast of the Immaculate Conception on Nehasie 7 (August 13). The 96th chapter of the Kebra Nagast states: "He cleansed Eve's body and sanctified it and made for it a dwelling in her for Adam's salvation. Mary was born without blemish, for He made Her pure, without pollution".

Eastern Orthodoxy

The Eastern Orthodox Churches does not accept the Roman Catholic dogma of the Immaculate Conception. Accordingly, they celebrate 9 December called the “Feast of the Conception by Saint Anne of the Most Holy Theotokos”. 

While the Orthodox believe that the Virgin Mary was, from her conception, filled with every grace of the Holy Spirit, in view of her calling as the Mother of God, they do not teach that she was conceived without original sin as their understanding and terminology of the doctrine of original sin differs from the Roman Catholic articulation. The Orthodox do, however, affirm that Mary is "all-holy" and never committed a personal sin during her lifetime.

The Orthodox feast is not a perfect nine months before the feast of the Nativity of the Theotokos (8 September) as it is in the West, but a day later. This feast is not ranked among the Great Feasts of the church year, but is a lesser-ranking feast (Polyeleos).

Designation as public holiday 

The solemnity is a registered public holiday in the following sovereign countries and territories: 
  Andorra
  Argentina
  Austria
  Chile
  Colombia — its peoples cook many food and delicacies honoring this day. 
  Equatorial Guinea
  Guam (USA)
  Italy  — it is a national holiday while since 1953, the Pope in his capacity as Bishop of Rome visits the Column of the Immaculate Conception in Piazza di Spagna to offer expiatory prayers commemorating the solemn event. The day marks the start of the Christmas season in the country.
  Liechtenstein 
  Macau, China — by Government Executive Order No. 60/2000, published on 29 September 2000 and enforced into legal effect since 1 January 2001. 
  Malta
  Monaco — it is celebrated with food festivities, particularly honoring mothers and grandmothers. 
  Nicaragua – the solemnity is celebrated with local parades and religious processions. 
  Panama – it is celebrated throughout the country as Mother's day. 
  Paraguay
  Peru
  Philippines – the day is designated as a non—working Public holiday in honor of the Virgin Mary as Patroness of the country and was permanently signed into constitutional law as holiday on 28 December 2017 by the Government of the Philippines. 
  Portugal 
  San Marino
  Seychelles
  Spain — since 8 November 1760, the day is marked as a national holiday as designated by Pope Clement XIII. 
  Switzerland — At present, 13 out of 26 cantons have elected to make this is a registered public holiday in accordance with government laws.  
  East Timor
  Vatican 
  Venezuela

See also
 Feast of the Conception of the Virgin Mary (antecedent)
 Patronages of the Immaculate Conception

Notes

External links
Conception of the Theotokos Article about the Orthodox feast from Orthodoxwiki.org

Public holidays in Spain
Public holidays in Italy
December observances
Marian feast days
Catholic holy days
Winter events in Spain